This is a list of Storage area network (SAN) management systems. A storage area network is a dedicated network that provides access to consolidated, block level data storage.

Systems
 Brocade Network Advisor
 Cisco Fabric Manager
 Enterprise Fabric Connectivity (EFC) Manager
 EMC ControlCenter
 EMC VisualSRM
 EMC Invista
 Hitachi Data Systems HiCommand
 HP OpenView Storage Area Manager
 IBM SAN Volume Controller
 Symantec Veritas Command Central Storage
 KernSafe Cross-Platform iSCSI SAN

References

Network management
Storage area networks